Edwarda de Oliveira Dias (born 22 April 1999) is a Brazilian Paralympic volleyball player. She won the bronze medal playing for the Brazilian Women's National Team in sitting volleyball at the 2016 Summer Paralympics in Rio de Janeiro. It was the first medal of Brazil in sitting volleyball at the Paralympics.

After the success in the 2016 Paralympics in Rio, Dias represented Brazil at the 2020 Paralympics in Tokyo playing as a striker, setter, central, midfielder, and winger in the national sitting volleyball team. At the Tokyo 2020 Paralympic Games, the Brazilian Women's National Team in sitting volleyball, where Dias was one of the key players, won the bronze medal again, following their win over Canada 3–1 at Makuhari Messe Hall.

In February 2022, Dias along with other members of the Brazilian women's sitting volleyball team is trained at the Paralympic Training Center in São Paulo to prepare for the Paris 2024 cycle.

References 

1999 births
Volleyball players at the 2016 Summer Paralympics
Medalists at the 2016 Summer Paralympics
Brazilian women's sitting volleyball players
Living people
Paralympic volleyball players of Brazil